Cerdon College is a Roman Catholic secondary school for girls, located in Merrylands, a western suburb of Sydney, New South Wales, Australia.

History
Established in 1960 by the Marist Sisters, the college was named after the town in France, the birthplace of the Marist Sisters. The Sisters' foundress, Jeanne-Marie Chavoin, is the patroness of the college.

In five decades, the number of students has risen from just 50 to over 1000 girls.

Marist heritage remains a central element of the teaching practices within Cerdon College, with the education of its students augmented by the traditions of the Marist Sisters.

Notable alumni

Dai Le Member of the House of Representatives, Australian Parliament, 2022-

References

External links
 Cerdon College, Merrylands

Catholic secondary schools in Sydney
Association of Marist Schools of Australia
Girls' schools in New South Wales
Educational institutions established in 1960
1960 establishments in Australia